Max is a 2015 American family adventure war drama film directed by Boaz Yakin, and co-written with Sheldon Lettich. The film stars Josh Wiggins,  Thomas Haden Church, Robbie Amell, Lauren Graham, Luke Kleintank, and Jay Hernandez. The film was released by Warner Bros. on June 26, 2015.

Plot 
Max, a Belgian Malinois military dog used to help U.S. Marines in Afghanistan, is handled by Kyle Wincott (Robbie Amell) (Marine MWD). Kyle is questioned when weapons seized by his squad go missing. Realizing his friend Tyler Harne (Luke Kleintank) is among those involved with the shady dealings, he warns Tyler that he cannot cover for him. The two then go into the battlefield with their squad, with Max on point. While advancing on a suicide bomber, Max is injured by an explosion. In the ensuing gunfight, Kyle is shot and killed.

Kyle's brother Justin (Josh Wiggins), who makes money selling illegally copied video games, their mother Pamela (Lauren Graham) and their father Ray (Thomas Haden Church) are informed of his death. After Kyle's body is brought home for burial, the other Marines notice that Max is only calm when he is around Justin, apparently sensing that he is Kyle's brother. The family adopts the dog, who would otherwise be euthanized for his disturbed behavior. Justin initially wants little to do with Max but eventually warms up to him. While meeting up with his friend Chuy (Dejon LaQuake), Justin meets Chuy's cousin Carmen (Mia Xitlali), who offers to go to his house and show him some handling tricks for Max. Little by little, Max's behavior improves around other people.

Tyler visits the Wincotts one evening, provoking an aggressive response by Max. Later, after the Fourth of July, Ray asks Tyler what really happened. Tyler implies that Max turned on Kyle and caused him to discharge his weapon on himself, leading to his death. Justin decides to investigate the matter. He receives a DVD of Kyle training Max; he later contacts a friend of Kyle, Sergeant Reyes, for help.

Later, Justin is approached by Chuy's other cousin Emilio (Joseph Julian Soria), a cartel member, who presses him over a video game bootleg. Afterwards, Justin and Max follow Emilio into the woods, where they secretly observe a meeting between cartel members and Tyler, who tries selling stolen weapons to them. The cartel's dogs sense Max and run after him. Max fights them off, severely wounding one of the dogs, while Justin runs away and leaves his bike behind. When he gets home, he finds Tyler and Stack, the cartel's dog handler, who was injured in the melee. Feigning innocence, they accuse Max of doing harm and demand his euthanization.

Max is taken by animal control officers but escapes. Meanwhile, Ray catches Tyler making a business deal with the cartel but is held hostage by Emilio. Max makes it home and leads Justin, Chuy, and Carmen into the woods to rescue Ray. Confronting the cartel, they incapacitate Emilio and the last cartel dog and rescue Ray. Tyler and Stack chase after Justin and Ray, but Stack is killed after crashing his off-road pickup truck. Tyler corners Justin at a damaged bridge and is threatening to shoot him and Max attacks Tyler and saves Justin's life. The two are knocked over the side of the bridge; while Tyler is killed by the fall, Max survives. Afterwards, Emilio is arrested and sent to jail.

The family welcomes Max into their home. After Justin and Max visit Kyle's grave, they invite Chuy and Carmen over for dinner.

Cast 
 Josh Wiggins as Justin Wincott, Ray and Pamela's son and Kyle's brother
 Carlos as Max, the titular character. He is initially owned by Kyle, but after Kyle's death, he is owned by Kyle's brother Justin
 Dejon LaQuake as Chuy
 Thomas Haden Church as Raymond "Ray" Wincott, Pamela's husband and Kyle and Justin's father
 Robbie Amell as Kyle Wincott, Ray and Pamela's son and Justin's brother
 Lauren Graham as Pamela Wincott, Ray's wife and Kyle and Justin's mother
 Luke Kleintank as Tyler Harne
 Jay Hernandez as Sgt. Reyes
 Miles Mussenden as Major Miles
 Mia Xitlali as Carmen
 Owen Harn as Deputy Stack
 Joseph Julian Soria as Emilio

Production 
In May 2014, Variety reported that Boaz Yakin would direct the family film titled Max for Warner Bros. and Metro-Goldwyn-Mayer. Principal photography began in North Carolina on May 12, 2014.

Release and reception 
The film was scheduled for release in the United States on January 30, 2015. Then it was pushed back to August 21, 2015, and on March 3, 2015, it was moved two months forward to June 26, 2015.

Box-office 
In the United States and Canada, Max opened simultaneously with the comedy Ted 2 across 2,850 theaters and was projected to earn around $10 million in its opening weekend. It earned $500,000 from its Thursday night showings and $4.3 million on its opening day (including the Thursday previews).<ref>{{cite web|url=https://www.boxofficemojo.com/news/?id=4074|title='Jurassic' and 'Inside' Adjust 'Teds Weekend|author=Keith Simanton|work=Box Office Mojo|publisher=Amazon.com|date=June 25, 2015|access-date=June 28, 2015}}</ref> Through its opening weekend, it grossed $12.2 million, fourth place among all films behind Jurassic World, Inside Out, and Ted 2.

 Critical response Max received mixed reviews from critics. On Rotten Tomatoes, the film holds an approval rating of 38%, based on 98 reviews, with an average rating of 4.82/10. The site's consensus reads, "Max has good intentions and tries to hearken back to classic family-friendly features, but its disjointed, manipulative plot overwhelms the efforts of its talented human and canine stars." On Metacritic, the film has a score of 47 out of 100, based on 25 critics, indicating "mixed or average reviews".

In CinemaScore polls conducted during the opening weekend, cinema audiences gave Max an average grade of "A" on an A+ to F scale.

 Sequel 
A sequel, Max 2: White House Hero'', was released theatrically on May 5, 2017. It was released digitally on May 9, 2017, and released on Blu-ray and DVD on May 23, 2017. However, this sequel is more lighthearted and family-friendly than the previous film.

References

External links 

 
 
 
 
 

2015 films
2015 drama films
2010s adventure drama films
2010s war films
American adventure drama films
American drama films
American war films
Animals of the United States Marine Corps
Films about dogs
Films about war dogs
Films directed by Boaz Yakin
Films scored by Trevor Rabin
Films shot in North Carolina
Films with screenplays by Boaz Yakin
Metro-Goldwyn-Mayer films
Warner Bros. films
2010s English-language films
2010s American films